Ni-Neith (or Hor-ni-Neith) was possibly an ancient Egyptian king (pharaoh) of the Dynasty 0 during the Predynastic epoch. Information about his family and his chronological position is currently unknown. Ni-Neith is known so far only by two clay inscriptions on burned vases, which come from the grave 257 in Helwan. The reading of the name is problematic because of the negligent execution; the Egyptologists Edwin van den Brink and Christiane Köhler are convinced of the reading as "Ni-Neith". A more precise time assignment is still pending.

See also 
 List of pharaohs

References 

32nd-century BC Pharaohs